Andre Young (born November 22, 1960) is a former professional American football player who played defensive back for two seasons for the  San Diego Chargers

References

1960 births
Sportspeople from Monroe, Louisiana
Players of American football from Louisiana
American football safeties
Louisiana Tech Bulldogs football players
San Diego Chargers players
Living people